Gingin is a town in Western Australia, located on the Brand Highway  north of the Perth city centre. It is the council seat for the Shire of Gingin local government area. The town's economy is mostly based on its agriculture, although there has been an increasing focus on science with the establishment of the Australian International Gravitational Observatory and Gravity Discovery Centre. There is also a small military airfield, RAAF Gingin, located nearby.

History
The first European to visit the area was the explorer George Fletcher Moore; he arrived in 1836 and recorded the Aboriginal name "Jinjin" on his charts.

The first property to be established in the area by William Locke Brockman in 1841 was named Gingin station.
The meaning of the word Gingin is uncertain but is thought to mean "footprint" or "place of many streams".

A townsite, Granville, was established close by in 1839 but once Gingin was gazetted in 1871 Granville was never developed.

By 1853 an area along Gingin Brook was fenced for horses to rest on the way from Perth to Geraldton and a police station was built nearby.

Construction of the telegraph line between Gingin and Perth was completed in 1886, and the railway line was completed in 1891. Gingin was declared a town in 1883.

Economy

The town is well suited for agriculture with a mild climate and available water sources. The area supports many forms of farming including beef cattle, cereal crops, olives, oranges and mangoes.

In 2003, plans were unveiled to construct the Gravity Discovery Centre near Gingin adjacent to the existing Australian International Gravitational Observatory. A.I.G.O. is part of a worldwide array of observatories, completing the southern arm of the array to obtain three-dimensional measurements of gravitational waves. The public arm of A.I.G.O. – The Gravity Discovery Centre includes a 45 m tower that leans at an angle of 15 degrees that allows students to complete free fall experiments.

In 2006 the Zadko telescope, a robotic optical telescope, was installed into the 'Zadko Dome' near the Gravitational Observatory. The Zadko telescope is used for research on a worldwide scale, scanning the sky for potentially hazardous asteroids, and can be accessed remotely via the internet. It is a joint resource for the International Centre for Radio Astronomy Research. It is an equatorial fork-mounted Cassegrain reflector telescope with a primary mirror aperture of 1.007 m and a focal length of 4.0386 m. The telescope's optical design is a hybrid Ritchey–Chrétien.

Gingin is host to the annual British Car Day, held on the third Sunday of May.

Gingin's Australian rules football club plays in the Mortlock Football League.

Transport

Gingin is served by Transwa coaches.

See also 
 RAAF Gingin
 List of reduplicated Australian place names

References

Further reading 
 

Towns in Western Australia
Shire of Gingin